The LNFA 2013 season was the 19th season of top-tier American football in Spain. The season began with the Spanish Cup on November 11, 2012, and finished with the LNFA final on June 2, 2013.

LNFA Elite
Six teams entered the LNFA Elite, the top-tier level of American football in Spain. L'Hospitalet Pioners, Rivas Osos, Valencia Firebats and Badalona Dracs repeated from last year. Las Rozas Black Demons and Valencia Giants were promoted from last year LNFA.

Playoffs
The four top teams will play for the 2012 LNFA title. The semifinals will be 1st vs. 4th and 2nd vs. 3rd. The games will be played in the home of the highest seed.

LNFA
Twelve teams will entered the LNFA, the second level of American football in Spain. They will be divided in four conferences.

Each team will play twice against the other two teams of its conference and four more games against two teams of different conferences.

Regular season

North Conference

South Conference

East Conference

Center Conference

Playoffs
The eight top teams will compete for the promotion to the LNFA Elite. The LNFA champions will promote, while the runner-up will play the promotion playoff against the fifth team in the LNFA Elite.

External links
FEFA American Football Spanish Federation

Liga Nacional de Fútbol Americano
2013 in American football